1685 Toro is an asteroid and near-Earth object of the Apollo group on an eccentric orbit. It was discovered on 17 July 1948, by American astronomer Carl Wirtanen at Lick Observatory on Mount Hamilton, California. It is named for Betulia Toro Herrick, wife of astronomer Samuel Herrick.

Classification and orbit 

Toro is an Apollo asteroid, a subgroup of near-Earth asteroids that cross the orbit of Earth. It orbits the Sun at a distance of 0.8–2.0 AU once every 584 days. Its orbit has an eccentricity of 0.44 and an inclination of 9° with respect to the ecliptic.

This asteroid's orbit also shows a 5:8 resonance with Earth and in a near 5:13 resonance with Venus. This near resonance results from Earth and Venus being in a near 8:13 resonance with each other. It was the third Apollo asteroid to be discovered. The current resonance with Earth will last for only a few thousand years. Calculations show that Toro will leave it in 2960 CE, and that it will enter the region of 5:13 resonance with Venus in 3470 CE. This is because the distance from Earth's orbit will become larger and that from Venus's orbit smaller. A study of long-term stability shows that the alternating resonances will possibly be broken roughly 3 million years from now because of close approaches between Toro and Mars.

Based on orbital paths, Toro is the best candidate for the source of the Sylacauga meteorite, the first meteorite authenticated to have struck a human, Mrs. Ann Hodges of Sylacauga, Alabama on 30 November 1954. With an orbital uncertainty U = 0, its orbit and future close approaches are well determined.

Naming 

This minor planet was named after the maiden name of Betulia (née Toro) Herrick, wife of American astronomer Samuel Herrick. Herrick had studied the asteroid's orbit, and requested the name, along with the other asteroid, 1580 Betulia. The official  was published by the Minor Planet Center on 10 March 1966.

Physical characteristics 

In the Tholen and SMASS taxonomic scheme, Toro is characterized as a stony S-type asteroid. It is reported to be composed of L chondrite with a high albedo in the range of 0.24–0.34. It has an extremely well-measured rotation period of 10.2 hours. Its rotation period is slowly increasing due to the YORP effect.

References

External links 
 Lightcurve plot of 1685 Toro, Palmer Divide Observatory, B. D. Warner (2012)
 Lightcurve Database Query (LCDB), at www.minorplanet.info
 Dictionary of Minor Planet Names, Google books
 
 
 

001685
Discoveries by Carl A. Wirtanen
Named minor planets
001685
001685
19480717